South Lakes High School is a public high school in Reston, Virginia, United States. The school serves grades 9-12 for the Fairfax County Public Schools.

History
South Lakes High School opened in 1978 with grades 7-10. Students in the first 10th-grade class had attended either Herndon or Oakton High Schools for grade 9. In the 1979-80 school year, the school had grades 7-11. Langston Hughes Intermediate School was supposed to open in the fall of 1980, but there were construction delays. As a result, for the first quarter of the 1980-1981 school year, South Lakes had a split shift so intermediate school (grades 7-8) students attended in the morning and high school (grades 9-12) students attended in the afternoon. Langston Hughes opened in time for 2nd quarter. South Lakes' first graduating class was the class of 1981 (who attended the school for three years).

South Lakes underwent a $55 million renovation from winter 2006 through August 2008. The renovation was completed in time for the 2008–2009 school year. A second renovation, completed in the winter of 2018, gave the school a new wing.

Notable people

Maame Biney, short track speed skater who competed in the 2018 Winter Olympics
Benny Blanco, rapper, songwriter, producer
David M. Ewalt, author and journalist
Grant Hill, professional basketball player
Michael Jackson, professional basketball player
Deon King, former NFL player
Thomas Mayo, NFL wide receiver
Jessica O'Toole and Amy Rardin, television writers
Walter Shaub, director of U.S. Office of Government Ethics from 2013 to 2017
Mikie Sherrill, member of the U.S. House of Representatives from New Jersey's 11th district
Wes Suter, gymnast who competed in the 1988 olympics
Eddie Timanus, 5-Time Jeopardy! champion; USA Today sportswriter
Alan Webb, Olympic runner, U.S. high school mile record holder (3:53.43), and American mile record holder
Christy Winters-Scott, NBC basketball announcer, University of Maryland women's basketball player, now the head girls basketball coach at South Lakes

References

External links

 

Reston, Virginia
Educational institutions established in 1979
High schools in Fairfax County, Virginia
Public high schools in Virginia
1979 establishments in Virginia